Shubham Jaglan (born 16 August 2004) is an Indian amateur golfer who won the Junior World Golf Championships in 2015. Jaglan is also World Record holder, 9 under in Classic Junior Open, 2012 and is recipient of the "NDTV – Emerging Player" and "Margdarshan" awards. Jaglan has won over 100 domestic and international tournaments.

Early life
Jaglan was born in village Israna, Panipat district, Haryana. His father is a milkman by profession and his family practices Pehlwani. He received his primary education in his village and now studies at the Laxman Public School in Delhi.

Golf career
An NRI named Kapur Singh started a golf academy in Jaglan's village. Jaglan was enrolled into the academy by his grandfather. Against the wishes of his family and despite the academy shutting down, Jaglan continued his practice on a small piece of land in his backyard. This land was cleaned by his father and converted into a green with three holes. Most of Jaglan's formative training was self-taught from videos on YouTube.

He was later spotted by The Golf Foundation that gave him annual scholarship of INR 2.0 lakh and a membership in the Delhi Golf Club, which in turn helped the father and son to relocate to Delhi to continue his training.

Tournament wins
2013 World Masters of Junior Golf
2015 Junior World Golf Championships
2016 European Junior Championship

References 

Indian male golfers
Amateur golfers
Golfers from Haryana
2004 births
Living people